Hipertrofia (Hypertrophy) is the third album by Coma, released on November 10, 2008. The album consists of two compact discs with 35 songs. Hypertrophy is a concept album where all songs are connected with a single leading thought.
This album was the best rock album in 2008 according to Antyradio

Track listing

CD 1

CD 2

Personnel
 Rafał Matuszak - (Bass guitar)
 Dominik Witczak - (Guitar)
 Marcin Kobza - (Guitar)
 Adam Marszałkowski - (Drums)
 Piotr Rogucki - (Vocal)

Charts

References

2008 albums
Coma (band) albums